Paolo Antonio Paderna (1649–1708) was an Italian painter of the Baroque period. Born in Bologna, he was a pupil of the painter Guercino, then of Carlo Cignani.

References

1649 births
1708 deaths
17th-century Italian painters
Italian male painters
18th-century Italian painters
Painters from Bologna
Italian Baroque painters
18th-century Italian male artists